Air Chief Marshal Surinder Kumar Mehra (15 November 1932 – 8 December 2003), PVSM, AVSM, VM, was the Chief of Air Staff of Indian Air Force from 1 August 1988 until 31 July 1991. He was born in Delhi.

Early life 
He was born in Delhi on 15 November 1932, educated at the Modern School in New Delhi, and thereafter at the Delhi University.

Career 
He was commissioned in the Indian Air Force in December 1951 as a fighter pilot.

From 1973 to 1976 he went on to command the Tactics and Air Combat Development Establishment division, followed by posting as Air Attaché in the Indian Ambassador's Office in Russia. He was awarded AVSM in 1976. After being promoted to the rank of Air Commodore, he assumed command of Adampur and later Jamnagar Air Force stations.

In 1987, he was appointed Air Officer Commanding-in-Chief, South Western Air Command with the responsibility of all air operations in Rajasthan, Gujarat and Maharashtra. In 1988, he took over as the Chief of Air Staff. He retired in 1991. Air Chief Marshal Polly Mehra died on 8 December 2003.

References 

1932 births
2003 deaths
Chiefs of Air Staff (India)
Indian Air Force air marshals
Indian Air Force officers
Recipients of the Param Vishisht Seva Medal
Modern School (New Delhi) alumni
Recipients of the Vayu Sena Medal
Recipients of the Ati Vishisht Seva Medal
Indian air attachés